Pariveh-ye Sofla (also Romanized as Parīveh-ye Soflá; also known as Parīvar-e Pā’īn, Parīveh, and Parīveh-ye Pā’īn) is a village in Howmeh Rural District, in the Central District of Harsin County, Kermanshah Province, Iran. At the 2006 census, its population was 1,081, in 264 families.

References 

Populated places in Harsin County